Stenhousemuir is a town in the Central Lowlands of Scotland. It lies within the Falkirk council area of Scotland. The villages of Carron and Carronshore adjoin Stenhousemuir to the east but to a lesser extent. At the 2001 census it showed that it had a resident population of 10,351 but according to a 2009 estimate this was revised to around 10,190 residents. The combined population of the four localities in 2011 was 24,722, representing about 15% of the Falkirk council area total.

In 2008, a £15 million town centre development scheme was completed and opened which provided a new civic square, a library and large retailing outlets for Stenhousemuir.

History

The "stone house" from which the village took its name was a Roman building on the north of the Carron River Valley known in later centuries as Arthur's O'on, i.e. King Arthur's oven. It is no longer to be seen, having been demolished to rebuild a dam on the River Carron by Sir Michael Bruce of Stenhouse in 1743.  The stones were swept away in a flood soon after. Detailed drawings had been made in the 1720s and a replica was made in 1763 to serve as a dovecote on the roof of the stable block of Penicuik House in Midlothian, and this remains. The site of the original building has been localised to the garden of a modern house on a housing estate, apparently by the American academic Norma Lorre Goodrich (1917–2006).

Stenhousemuir became home to the "Falkirk Tryst" from 1785 - one of the largest gatherings of livestock farmers and buyers from all over Scotland and beyond. After the decline of the Tryst in Crieff, the Falkirk Tryst came to be held more frequently, on the second Tuesdays of August, September and October each year. Thomas Gisbourne in his "Essay on Agriculture" described the Tryst in 1849 as "a scene to which Great Britain, perhaps even the whole world, does not afford a parallel". The Trysts continued until the late 19th century.

The town was home to the McCowan's toffee factory, established in 1922, who made both traditional toffee and also the Wham Bar.

Sport

Stenhousemuir F.C. play football at Ochilview Park and are currently in Scottish League Two.  The Tryst Golf Club, built in 1885, has its clubhouse in Burnhead Road, which is arguably in Larbert.

The Cricket Club has been in existence since 1876. It has produced international players representing Scotland and had a number of notable cricket professionals playing for the club e.g. Abdul Qadir.

Landmarks
Ochilview Park, McCowan's Toffee Factory (now demolished), Falkirk Tryst Golf Club and Stenhousemuir Cricket Club are all accessible via Tryst Road, leading north out of the village. The street is so called because it was the site of the annual Tryst. On the anniversary of the Tryst in September each year, a travelling funfair comes to the site.

There are four churches in the village: nearer the centre of the village is Larbert East Church with its imposing tower, meanwhile one third of a mile to the east of the village centre on the aptly named Church Street is the Stenhouse and Carron church which is smaller but more distinctive architecturally, designed in 1897 by the firm of John James Burnet. The village is home to a Salvation Army church and community centre housed in a modern building adjacent to Stenhousemuir Primary school. Further west along Main Street lies the Roman Catholic church of Our Lady of Lourdes and St Bernadette. Larbert West church sits just across the old boundary of Burnhead Road between Stenhousemuir and South Broomage.

The shopping area of Stenhousemuir was renovated in 2008. A new library with community area, football pitch and new shops including a  Asda supermarket alongside relocation of a number of existing businesses.

Part of the regeneration resulted in construction of a new community centre and rebuild of the medical centre which provides additional NHS support services to the area.

Notable people
William McAlpine (1922–2004) – leading tenor of the 1950s and 1960s
John Walker Sharpe FRSE FIP (1916-1997) physicist
Jimmy and John Hodge, footballer siblings who both played for Manchester United in the 1910s
Brian Hardie (born 1950), Essex and Scotland cricketer

See also
 List of places in Falkirk

References

External links

 Stenhousemuir Cricket Club
 McCowan’s Toffee
 Arthur's O'on

 
Towns in Falkirk (council area)